Lonely Heart is a live album by avant-rock, experimental power trio Massacre, featuring guitarist Fred Frith, bassist Bill Laswell and drummer Charles Hayward. It was recorded at the Festival Sons d'Hiver in Paris, France on January 25, 2003, and at the Roskilde Festival in Denmark on June 26, 2003.

Track listing
All tracks composed by Massacre.
"Send" – 19:49 	
"Step" – 5:11 	
"In" – 7:40 	
"Gracias a la Vida" – 18:31 	
"Return" – 6:53
Source: AllMusic, Discogs.

Personnel
Massacre
Fred Frith – guitar
Bill Laswell – bass guitars
Charles Hayward – drums, voice, melodica

Sound and artwork
Oz Fritz – engineer, live mixing
Peter Hardt – mixing
Myles Boisen – pre-mastering
Scott Hull – mastering
Fred Frith – producer
Kazunori Sugiyama – associate executive producer
John Zorn – executive producer
Heung-Heung Chin – design
Heike Liss – photography
Source: Discogs.

References

2007 live albums
Massacre (experimental band) albums
Tzadik Records live albums
Albums produced by Fred Frith
Live free improvisation albums